Piola rubra is a species of beetle in the family Cerambycidae. It was described by Martins and Galileo in 1999. It is known from Bolivia.

References

Phacellini
Beetles described in 1999